Levanzo (Sicilian: Lèvanzu) is the smallest of the three main Aegadian Islands in the Mediterranean Sea west of Sicily, Italy. It forms a part of the municipality (comune) of Favignana in the Province of Trapani.

Geography
The island has an estimated 450 inhabitants, who are concentrated around a tiny port, that gives little shelter from storms.

The ancient name of the island was "Phorbantia" which is a sort of plant that commonly grows there.

Levanzo is famous for the "Grotta del Genovese" with Neolithic cave paintings and Palaeolithic graffiti.

Furthermore, in the water of Cala Minnola, on the eastern side of the island of Levanzo, there is one of the most important sicilian underwater archaeological site in which a Roman cargo ship, loaded with wine amphoras, lies at 27 meters of depth.

See also
 List of islands of Italy

References

External links

Grotta del Genovese - Official website

Archaeological sites in Sicily
Aegadian Islands